The Aruba-Curaçao-Bonaire cactus scrub ecoregion (WWF ID: NT1302) covers the dry land on the semi-arid islands of Aruba, Curaçao, and Bonaire in the southern Caribbean Sea, about 80 km from the mainland of Venezuela.  In low-lying coastal areas the islands also support mangrove wetlands.  The landscape features a range of cactus species and acacia trees.

Location and description
The three islands are on the coastal shelf of South America, with bedrock of limestone and quartz diorite. Aruba has an area of 179 km2, with the highest population density. Bonaire, the farthest island to the east, features a ringing coral reef and numerous inlets, lagoons, and mangrove forests. Some parts of the islands transition into the Guajira–Barranquilla xeric scrub ecoregion.

Climate
The climate of the ecoregion is Hot semi-arid (Köppen climate classification (BSh)). This climate is characteristic of steppes, and in these islands supports a relatively even warm temperature of near 26.7 degrees C year-round.  The trade winds from the Atlantic are a notable feature of the climate.  Precipitation averages 350-550 mm/year, with a wet season from October to December.

Flora and fauna
Most of the terrain is sparsely vegetated with cactus scrub. Common species of cactus are dagger cactus (Stenocereus griseus), Subpilocereus repandus (a Ceroid cactus), Pilosocereus lanuginosus (which is endemic to this ecoregion), melon cactus (Melocactus), and prickly pear (Opuntia).  The columnar cactus can reach heights of 6 meters.  Aloe vera is an important commercial plant.  The national tree of Curaçao is the distinctive divi divi tree (Libidibia coriaria), which is often contorted by the trade winds on the coast.  Interspersed with the cactus are scrub or small trees such as twisted acacia (Vachellia tortuosa).

Protected areas
Officially protected areas on the islands include:
 Arikok National Park, on Aruba
 Christoffelpark, on Curaçao
 Washington Slagbaai National Park, on Bonaire

References

Neotropical ecoregions
Deserts and xeric shrublands
Ecoregions of the Caribbean